Diabugu  is a village in eastern Gambia. It is located in Sandu District in the Upper River Division. It is the biggest village in Sandu. It was founded by Foday Sillah about 1650. Foday Sillah's grandson Foday Sillah junior established the village of Jagejari as a farming centre. As time goes on some of his children settled there permanently.

Foday Sillah Junior's son Ba Sillah was the last Alkalo village head of Diabugu among the Sillah Kunda dynasty. Ba Sillah went to established a new settlement called Diabugu Ba Sillah South of the River Gambia. He then left the village to his first cousin and brother-in-law Mahamadou Mankoro Drammeh Sama. The Drammeh Sama of Diabugu has since inherited the leadership of Diabugu Batapa. Under the leadership of  Mankoro's eldest son Madala Drammeh Sama, the Drammeh Kanji and Drammeh Sama were united. Inheritance of the Alkaloship is now based on seniority.

The first Drammeh Kanji to become Alkalo of Diabugu was Batapa Drammeh. He was a brave giant of Drammeh Kunda and because of this bravery, Diabugu has his name..

According to local sources, the following served as Headsmen of Diabugu
the list is not exhaustive and based on narrations;
1. Foday "Baba" Sillah- Founding Father
2. Kissima Sillah, he later left to established his own settlement, East-south of Basse called Sabu-Sireh
3. Abdou Sillah
4. Ba Sillah
 the Sillah left clan left the settlement to establish various villages e.g Jegajari, Diabugu Ba Sillah Diabugu Badara, Madina Samako, Madina Nfally and  transferred the Alikaloship to Drammeh
5. Ebrima Drammeh
6. Kekero Jalia Drammeh
7. Batapa Drammeh
8. Madala Drammeh
9. Kibili Kaka Drammeh
10. Kibili Henda Drammeh
11. Sorrie Juma Drammeh
12. Ka- Hammeh Drammeh
13. Ka Tamba Drammeh
14. Madala Tuguneh Drammeh
15. Alhagie Yugu kasseh Drammeh
16. Alhagie Kissima Sorie Drammeh
17. Mansa Drammeh
18. Alhajie Kursa Drammeh- The present Alikalo (Degumeh)

Diabugu is the most prominent Sarahuleh village, that embrace western education and it has lot of government facilities. Accordingly an infant school was established in the early 1940s, follow by a clinic and veterinary station. later in 1961, Gambia Government build a primary school to cater for the growing need of western education.

Diabugu also held chieftain of Sandu District. The Following served as Chiefs:
Batapa Drammeh (1925-1941)
Yogou Kaseh Drammeh (1941/2-1972)
Alhajie Seikou Baye Drammeh (1973- 1990)
Ansumana Mansa Drammeh (2000-2003)

In 2016, it had an estimated population of 9,000.

References

Populated places in the Gambia
Upper River Division